In algebraic topology, Johnson–Wilson theory E(n) is a generalized cohomology theory introduced by .

References

Homotopy theory